The 2019 Asia Rugby Women's Sevens Series was the twentieth edition of Asia's continental sevens tournament. The series was played over three legs in South Korea, China, and Sri Lanka.

The top three teams earned qualification to the 2020–21 World Series Qualifier for a chance to earn core team status for the following World Series.

Teams
The eight "core teams" qualified to participate in all series events for 2019 are:

 
 
 
 

 
 
 
 

Malaysia was promoted to core team status after winning the 2018 SevensTrophy in Singapore, replacing South Korea who were relegated after finishing as the lowest-placed core team in 2018.

Tour venues
The official schedule for the 2019 Asia Rugby Women's Sevens Series is:

Final standings

Tournaments

South Korea

The tournament was held 31 August – 1 September in South Korea. All times in Korea Standard Time (UTC+09:00).

Pool stage

Pool C

Pool D

Knockout stage

Plate

Cup

China
The tournament was held 14–15 September in Huizhou. All times in China Standard Time (UTC+08:00).

Pool stage

Pool C

Pool D

Knockout stage

Plate

Cup

Sri Lanka

The tournament was held 28–29 September in Colombo. All times in Sri Lanka Standard Time (UTC+05:30).

Pool stage

Pool C

Pool D

Knockout stage

Plate

Cup

Sevens Trophy
The Sevens Trophy tournament acts as a qualifier for the 2020 main series.

Teams
The nine teams participating in the 2019 tournament are:

 
 
 
 
 

 
 
 
 

South Korea were relegated after finishing as the lowest-placed team in 2018 main series, replacing the 2018 Sevens Trophy winners Malaysia.

Venue

Final standings

See also
 2019 Asia Rugby Sevens Series
 2020 Hong Kong Women's Sevens

References

2019
2019 rugby sevens competitions
2019 in Asian rugby union
2019 in women's rugby union
International rugby union competitions hosted by South Korea
International rugby union competitions hosted by China
International rugby union competitions hosted by Sri Lanka
rugby union
rugby union
rugby union